Smart sensor may refer to 

 Smart transducer, an analog or digital transducer or actuator combined with a processing unit and a communication interface
 A more general term for smart cameras